Durham-Shores House is a historic home located near Dupont Station, Kent County, Delaware.  It is an "L"-shaped dwelling constructed in two parts.  Its original plan was as a "house and garden" style dwelling a 1 1/2-half-story, two-bay dwelling containing a single finished room on the ground floor and a second room above. The original section was built about 1860.  A two-story, four-bay, block built about 1910, forms the stem of the "L."

It was listed on the National Register of Historic Places in 2001.

References

Houses on the National Register of Historic Places in Delaware
Houses completed in 1910
Houses in Kent County, Delaware
National Register of Historic Places in Kent County, Delaware